Maurice J. "Clipper" Smith (October 15, 1898 – March 17, 1984) was an American football player and coach of football, basketball, and baseball. He served as the head football coach at Gonzaga University (1925–1928), Santa Clara University (1929–1935), Villanova College—now known as Villanova University (1936–1942), the University of San Francisco (1946), and Lafayette College (1949–1951), compiling a career college football record of 108–76–12. Smith was also the head coach of the National Football League's Boston Yanks from 1947 to 1948, tallying a mark of 7–16–1. In addition, he was the head basketball coach at Gonzaga from 1925 to 1929 and the head baseball coach at the school for one season in 1926, notching a record of 4–11.

Smith died on March 17, 1984, at his home in Laguna Beach, California.

Head coaching record

College football

References

1898 births
1984 deaths
American football guards
Basketball coaches from Illinois
Boston Yanks coaches
Gonzaga Bulldogs athletic directors
Gonzaga Bulldogs baseball coaches
Gonzaga Bulldogs football coaches
Gonzaga Bulldogs men's basketball coaches
Lafayette Leopards football coaches
Notre Dame Fighting Irish football players
Portland Pilots football coaches
Portland Pilots men's basketball coaches
San Francisco Dons football coaches
Santa Clara Broncos football coaches
Sportspeople from the Chicago metropolitan area
Villanova Wildcats athletic directors
Villanova Wildcats football coaches
People from Manteno, Illinois